An open ballot system is a voting method in which voters vote openly, in contrast to a secret ballot, where a voter's choices are confidential.

The open ballot system was the norm prior to Australia adopting the secret ballot in 1856. It was also used in Argentina until the adoption of secret ballot in 1912. In modern times, the open ballot, also known as Option A4, was first adopted in the Third Nigerian Republic during the 1993 Nigerian presidential election, an election widely considered by Nigerians as the freest and fairest in the country's political history.

See also

1993 Nigerian presidential election
Moshood Abiola
Humphrey Nwosu

References

Further reading
 
 Nigeria National Electoral Commission. Open Ballot System and Electioneering Campaign Laws and Guidelines (1990)

Voting
Ballots